Hershon is a surname. Notable people with the surname include:

Goldie Hershon (1941–2020), Canadian activist
Robert Hershon (1936–2021), American poet and writer